Adrian Henger (born 18 May 1996) is a Polish professional footballer who plays as a goalkeeper for Vineta Wolin.

References

External links
 

1996 births
People from Goleniów
Sportspeople from West Pomeranian Voivodeship
Living people
Polish footballers
Association football goalkeepers
Pogoń Szczecin players
Ekstraklasa players
III liga players
IV liga players